Allographa cerradensis is a species of lichen in the family Graphidaceae. Found in Brazil, it was described as new to science in 2011 as Graphis cerradensis but in 2018 it was transferred to its current genus, Allographa.

References

Lichen species
Lichens described in 2011
Lichens of Brazil
Taxa named by Robert Lücking